Fitzgibbon is an Irish surname of Anglo-Norman origin.

Fitzgibbon may also refer to:

 Fitzgibbon, Queensland, a suburb of Brisbane
 Fitzgibbon Cup, a trophy for a hurling championship among higher education institutions in Ireland, named after Edwin Fitzgibbon
 2015 Fitzgibbon Cup
 2016 Fitzgibbon Cup
 Fitzgibbon Hospital

See also
 
 Gibbons (surname)